Gaer may refer to:

Gaer, Newport, the electoral ward of Newport, South Wales
Gaer (Black Mountains), hill in the Black Mountains of Wales
Y Gaer, a Roman fort near the modern-day town of Brecon, Mid Wales

See also 
  Caer